İye (sometimes İne or Eğe; , İyĕ; , İyä; , İççi; , Эе; , Ee; , Эга;  or ; , Ije) is a spirit in Turkic mythology who is a tutelary deity of a place, person, lineage, nation, natural assets or an animal. Although such spirits are called  "masters" or "possessors", they are not necessarily subject to worship. They may be revered as sacred essence of things without being deified or even personified.

Master spirits
The term means owner, master, lord, possessor in Turkic languages. Ezen (familiar spirit, protector spirit) has the same meaning (owner, possessor) in the Mongolian language.

An İye guides, helps, or protects animals, individuals, lineages, nations, and even inanimates assets such as mountains or rivers. According to the shamanic worldview, everything is alive, bearing an inherent virtue and power. In this context power animals represent a person's connection to all life, their qualities of character, and their power. They are the helping or ministering spirit or familiar which empowers individuals and is essential for success in any venture undertaken. It is believed that most persons have power animals, or tutelary spirits, which empower and protect them from harm – this is comparable to tutelary deities. In these traditions, the İye may also lend the wisdom or attributes of its kind to those under its protection.

Also each town or city had one or more İye, whose protection was considered particularly vital in time of war and siege. An İye is spirit who is regarded as the tutelary spirit or protector of a nation, place, clan, family, or person.

Mythology 
Aynur Gazanfargizi states that, according to Tengrism, God (Tengri) created the İye and give them dominion other a specific place. They would have been similar to that of angels in Abrahamic religions. However, often only their negative impact is remembered and thus have often been demonized. She argues that the İye is neither thought to be inherently good or bad, but the İye's attitude depends on human's respect towards the nature of their domain: If the İye of a garden would be disrespected, it would cause the garden to wither. If the İye is respected however, the garden will prosper. She criticizes both the demonization of İye as demons (Kara İye), as well as the deification of them done by Western researches. İyes would be neither inherently good nor bad, but sent by God to interact with humans in a respectful manner.

According to myths among the Turks collected by Verbitsky Vasily, the İye appear similar to fallen angels. When Erlik desired to create a world on his own to fill it with his own people, Ülgen was ordered to threw Erlik and his servants out of the sky. A battle occurred and Erlik was injured, cast into the underworld, along with his servants. They fell like water drops, and each of his servants became a spirit corresponding with the specific element it fell into. Thus, whose who fell into fire became od-iyeler (İye of fire), whose who fell into water became su-iyeler (İye of water), etc.

Well-known İyes
Su iyesi: Spirit of water.
Od iyesi: Spirit of fire.
Ev iyesi: Household spirit of house.
Yel iyesi: Spirit of wind.
Dağ iyesi: Protector spirit of mountains.
Orman iyesi: Protector spirit of forest.
Irmak iyesi: Owner of river.
Abzar iyesi: Owner of courtyard.
Yer iyesi: Sacred spirit of earth.

Other spirits
These are at the orter of other İyes.

Aran iyesi, Damız iyesi, Kitre iyesi: Spirit of stable.
Avul iyesi, Köy iyesi, Bucak iyesi: Spirit of village.
Ağaç iyesi, Yığaç iyesi: Spirit of tree.
Bulak iyesi, Pınar iyesi, Çeşme iyesi: Spirit of fountain.
Değirmen iyesi: Spirit of mill.
Ekin iyesi, Arış iyesi: Spirit of corn.
Ergene iyesi, Urkay iyesi, Şahta iyesi: Spirit of mine pit.
Mal iyesi, Sığır iyesi: Spirit of cattle.
Kıla iyesi, Hayvan iyesi: Spirit of animals.
Otağ iyesi, Çadır iyesi, Çerge İyesi: Spirit of tent.
Söğök iyesi, Gur iyesi, Gömüt İyesi: Spirit of grave.
Tarla iyesi, Basu iyesi, Etiz İyesi: Spirit of field.
Toplak iyesi, Mescid iyesi: Spirit of mosque.
Yol iyesi, Yolak iyesi: Spirit of road.
Yunak iyesi, Hamam iyesi, Cağlık iyesi: Spirit of bath.
Ören iyesi, Peg iyesi, Çaldıbar iyesi: Spirit of ruins.
İn iyesi, Mağara iyesi, Ünkür iyesi: Spirit of cave.
Bulut iyesi: Spirit of clouds.
Kara iye: Spirit of underworld, comparable to a demon.

See also
 Familiar spirit
 Power animal
 Tutelary deity

References

External links
 Türk Mitoloji Sözlüğü, Pınar Karaca  (İççi), (İdi-İzi), (İye-Yiye)
 İyeler, Yaşar Kalafat 
 Gök Tengri İnancının Anadoludaki İzleri, Yaşar Kalafat